The 1975 Alberta general election was held on March 26, 1975, to elect members of the Legislative Assembly of Alberta to the 18th Alberta Legislature. The election was called on February 14, 1975 prorogued and dissolved of the 17th Alberta Legislature.

The Progressive Conservative Party led by incumbent Premier Peter Lougheed won its second term in government in a landslide, taking over 62 per cent of the popular vote and winning 69 of the 75 seats in the legislature to form a majority government.

The Social Credit Party saw its vote collapse. After 36 years in government from 1935 to 1971—virtually its entire history—it was ill-prepared for a role in opposition.  It lost over half of its popular vote from the previous election, and was cut down to only four MLAs—just barely holding onto official party status.

Background
The 1971 general election resulted in the Progressive Conservative Party led by Peter Lougheed defeating the Social Credit Party which had governed Alberta continuously for 36 years consecutive years. The Progressive Conservatives defeated the Social Credit Party by 5.3 per cent in the popular vote and formed a majority government.

Social Credit leader and former Premier Harry Strom continued as leader of the opposition until 1973 when he resigned, Strom continued in the legislature until the 1975 election, when he did not seek re-election. In the 1973 leadership election, Werner Schmidt, vice-president of Lethbridge Community College, who didn't hold a seat in the Legislative Assembly, ran against former Highways Minister Gordon Taylor, former Education Minister Robert Curtis Clark, and John Ludwig, dean of business education at Alberta College. Clark, who had the support of half of the party's MLAs, led Schmidt on the first ballot, 583 votes to 512 votes. But in an upset victory, Schmidt won on the second ballot with 814 votes, defeating Clark by 39 votes. Social Credit MLA Gordon Taylor grew detached with the party and supported Lougheed's plan to provide gas lines to rural areas. Taylor left the Social Credit caucus in 1975 just before the election.

The New Democratic Party led by leader Grant Notley captured a single seat in the 1971 general election.

The Alberta Liberal Party failed to capture a single seat in the 1971 general election led by leader Bob Russell. Russell contested the 1973 by-election in Calgary-Foothills finishing a distant fourth with 5.8 per cent of the vote. Russell resigned the leadership of the Liberal Party later in 1974, and was succeeded by Nicholas Taylor.

Election campaign

Progressive Conservative
Premier Peter Lougheed enjoyed strong support from his home constituency of Calgary-West, meaning he was able to campaign throughout the province.

The Progressive Conservative Party campaigned a platform on administrative competence and promises outlined in an unpassed 1975–76 budget. Leaning on successful negotiations with the federal and Ontario governments and oil companies for the development of oil sands in the Winnipeg Agreement only 11 days before the legislature was dissolved. Other promises included the creation of the Alberta Heritage Savings Trust Fund, reduction of personal income taxes by at least 28 per cent, and increased social program spending, all of which were built on growing non-renewable natural resource revenue resulting from 1970s energy crisis.

Campaign slogans utilized by the Progressive Conservatives included "Lougheed Leadership", "43 Months of Progress", and "Vote Today for Alberta".

The Progressive Conservative government was criticized for interference with the free market, which was exemplified with the 1974 purchase of Pacific Western Airlines for $37.5-million. The Lougheed government was also criticized for significant government spending authorized through Order-in-Council instead of appropriations through the Legislature.

Social Credit Party
The Social Credit Party ran a campaign advocating for the provincial government to provide low-interest loans to Albertans for housing, farming and small business purposes. Social Credit leader Werner Schmidt promoted greater revenue sharing with municipal governments, and more conciliatory stance to negotiations with the federal government, and greater emphasis on free market enterprise. The Social Credit Party referred to themselves as "the Alberta Party" throughout the election, but was unable to gather significant momentum with the phrase.

The Social Credit Party was only able to muster 70 candidates to contest the provinces 75 electoral districts. Many of the candidates focused their advertising dollars and canvassing efforts on highlighting their individual experience and value as a constituent representative rather than emphasizing the Party's platform.

New Democratic Party
NDP leader Grant Notley was elected to the Spirit River-Fairview district in 1971 by a slim margin in a competitive three-way race. The pressure in his home riding required Notley to do much of his campaigning in his home riding, and not in locations across the province.

Through his efforts in the Legislature, Notley gained a reputation as a hard-working, sincere and capable representative and critic of Peter Lougheed. The NDP as able to muster candidates for all 75 constituencies, and as the only opposition party with a full slate of candidates, the NDP created the election slogan "The Only Real Opposition".

The NDP's campaign strategy did not emphasis socialist programs in the early stages of the campaign, instead focusing on the Lougheed government's agreement with Syncrude for developing the oil sands. Notley and the NDP believed the Syncrude agreement would be the central issue of the election, as the agreement included significant public financial investments. Notley was able to obtain several confidential government documents relating to the Syncrude project's viability which the NDP released throughout the campaign, however the Progressive Conservatives steered away from debate on the subject. Later in the election the NDP brought forward more traditional socialist programs including children's dental care, increasing old age pensions, government run auto insurance and increasing public ownership of utility companies.

Liberal
The Liberal Party focused its campaign on leader Nick Taylor's charisma and environmental opposition to the Progressive Conservatives industrialization policy. Instead the Liberal Party emphasized that Alberta's economy should be focused on renewable resources such as agriculture, timber, tourism and modern professional skills. The Liberals emphasized their platform through the campaign slogan "The Alternative".

The Liberal Party was able to field 46 candidates in the province's 75 electoral districts, although with a majority of the Party's support coming from Calgary and Edmonton, many of the rural candidates were paper candidates. Much of the Liberal campaign resources were focused on urban candidates, with most of the resources going towards Taylor's Calgary-Glenmore constituency.

Results
To no one's surprise, the Progressive Conservative Party won a lopsided victory, capturing 62.7 per cent of the vote and 69 of 75 seats in the Legislature. The Edmonton Report cover featured a caricature of Peter Lougheed following the victory accompanied with the title "Peter The Greatest".

The Social Credit Party was further decimated as they dropped from 21 seats (from 25 to 4), capturing 18.2 per cent of the vote. Leader Werner Schmidt failed to capture his own seat in Taber-Warner, capturing 2,418 votes (33.43 per cent), coming second to Progressive Conservative Robert Bogle who captured 4,614 votes (63.78 per cent). Independent Social Credit candidate Gordon Taylor was able to retain his seat. Schmidt resigned as leader of the Social Credit Party days after the election.

The Liberal Party grew to nearly 5 per cent of the popular vote, but secured no seats. Nick Taylor came second in his constituency of Calgary-Glenmore with 4,166 votes, well behind the Progressive Conservative candidate Hugh Planche who garnered 10,641 votes. Taylor attributed the Liberal's overall poor performance to the connection with the unpopular federal Liberal Party.

The New Democratic Party leader Grant Notley was able to capture his seat in Spirit River-Fairview with 50.83 per cent of the vote, defeating his only opponent, Progressive Conservative Alex Woronuk. Despite garnering 12.9 per cent of the popular vote, the NDP was only able to capture Notley's seat. The NDP was still somewhat pleased that candidates came second in northern areas of the province and all 16 Edmonton constituencies.

Overall voter turnout in the election was 59.58 per cent.

Note:
* Party did not nominate candidates in the previous election.

Results by riding

|-
|Athabasca|||
|Frank Appleby3,72359.63%
|
|Peter Hupka5829.32%
|
|Peter E. Opryshko1,68627.01%
|
|John Murphy2263.62%
|
||||
|Frank Appleby
|-
|Banff|||
|Fred Kidd5,22168.92%
|
|Merlyn Kirk1,12914.90%
|
|Wayne Getty7379.73%
|
|Morna F. Schechtel4535.98%
|
||||
|
|-
|Barrhead|||
|Hugh F. Horner3,66567.48%
|
|Bill Seatter91916.92%
|
|Arlington Corbett82615.21%
|
|
|
||||
|Hugh F. Horner
|-
|Bonnyville|||
|Donald Hansen3,22656.66%
|
|George Nordstrom1,11919.65%
|
|Franklin Foster80514.14%
|
|Ron Pernarowski5269.24%
|
||||
|Donald Hansen
|-
|Bow Valley
|
|Jim C. George1,90637.41%|||
|Fred T. Mandeville2,99258.72%
|
|Syd Evans1833.59%
|
|
|
||||
|Fred T. Mandeville
|-
|Calgary-Bow|||
|Neil Webber5,25152.12%
|
|Roy Wilson3,53735.11%
|
|Jack Dunbar8798.72%
|
|Mike Prohaszka3143.12%
|
|David Whitefield (Comm.)640.64%|||
|Roy Wilson
|-
|Calgary-Buffalo|||
|Ronald H. Ghitter6,52570.69%
|
|Norman Ashmead7868.51%
|
|Paula Davies8779.50%
|
|Maria Eriksen96210.42%
|
|David Wallis (Comm.)550.60%|||
|Ronald H. Ghitter
|-
|Calgary-Currie|||
|Fred H. Peacock6,06872.85%
|
|Edwin Ens93911.27%
|
|Hiram Coulter7138.56%
|
|Ron Chahal5867.04%
|
||||
|Fred H. Peacock
|-
|Calgary-Egmont|||
|Merv Leitch10,86775.70%
|
|Lloyd Downey1,1197.79%
|
|Maureen McCutcheon7124.96%
|
|Jack Haggarty1,63411.38%
|
||||
|Merv Leitch
|-
|Calgary-Elbow|||
|David J. Russell6,15973.68%
|
|Bernard Laing5897.05%
|
|Jack Peters4495.37%
|
|Sharon Carstairs1,14913.75%
|
||||
|David J. Russell
|-
|Calgary-Foothills|||
|Stewart A. McCrae10,91767.50%
|
|Bill Campbell2,58716.00%
|
|Ken Gee1,3668.45%
|
|Acker Winn (Ind. Lib.)3242.01%Hilda Armstrong8935.52%
|
|David Gutnick (Comm.)550.34%
||
|Stewart A. McCrae
|-
|Calgary-Glenmore|||
|Hugh L. Planche10,64165.85%
|
|Ralph Cameron8385.19%
|
|Bill Peterson4983.08%
|
|Nicholas Taylor4,16625.78%
|
||||
|William Daniel Dickie
|-
|Calgary-McCall|||
|Andrew Little9,10264.91%
|
|George Ho Lem3,39724.22%
|
|Doreen Heath9977.11%
|
|Garry Willis4403.14%
|
|Colin Constant (Comm.)460.33%|||
|George Ho Lem
|-
|Calgary-McKnight|||
|Eric Charles Musgreave8,58667.80%
|
|Allen Howard1,57212.41%
|
|Ray Martin1,74713.80%
|
|Pat Smart7435.87%
|
||||
|Calvin E. Lee
|-
|Calgary-Millican|||
|Thomas Charles Donnelly4,97857.56%
|
|Arthur J. Dixon2,11424.44%
|
|Joseph Yanchula94010.87%
|
|Jodi Mahoney5125.92%
|
|Mike Daniels (Comm.)430.50%Roger Lavoie (Ind.)210.24%
||
|Arthur J. Dixon
|-
|Calgary-Mountain View|||
|John Kushner3,80048.76%
|
|Albert W. Ludwig2,56232.88%
|
|Orrin Kerr7259.30%
|
|John Sutherland5767.39%
|
|Joe Hill (Comm.)560.72%|||
|Albert W. Ludwig
|-
|Calgary-North Hill|||
|Roy Alexander Farran6,67370.51%
|
|Robert A. Simpson1,36414.41%
|
|Joan Ryan7237.64%
|
|Dorothy Groves5846.17%
|
|Stephen Whitefield (Comm.)600.63%|||
|Roy Alexander Farran
|-
|Calgary-West|||
|Peter Lougheed8,98378.28%
|
|Charles Gray1,21310.57%
|
|Neil Ellison6745.87%
|
|Steve Shaw5644.91%
|
||||
|Peter Lougheed
|-
|Camrose|||
|Gordon Stromberg6,48372.40%
|
|Ray Reid1,31314.66%
|
|David Moore1,14112.74%
|
|
|
||||
|Gordon Stromberg
|-
|Cardston|||
|John Thompson2,89959.77%
|
|Roy Sprackman1,82637.65%
|
|Kelty Paul1152.37%
|
|
|
||||
|Edgar W. Hinman
|-
|Clover Bar
|
|Murray Finnerty3,21134.23%|||
|Walt A. Buck5,15154.90%
|
|Duncan McArthur7998.52%
|
|David Cooke1972.10%
|
||||
|Walt A. Buck
|-
|Cypress|||
|Alan Hyland2,06553.21%
|
|Barry Bernhardt1,44737.28%
|
|Allen Eng2025.20%
|
|
|
|Margaret Dragland (Ind.)1594.10%|||
|Harry E. Strom
|-
|Drayton Valley|||
|Rudolph Zander3,22467.77%
|
|Tom Johnson51310.78%
|
|Lars Larson81517.13%
|
|Maurice Duteau1914.02%
|
||||
|Rudolph Zander
|-
|Drumheller
|
|Wayne Ohlhauser2,67836.29%
||
|Gordon E. Taylor (Ind. SoCred)4,42860.20%
|
|Larry Schowalter2493.37%
|
|
|
||||
|Gordon Edward Taylor
|-
|Edmonton-Avonmore|||
|Horst A. Schmid4,59660.87%
|
|Joe G. Radstaak1,34117.76%
|
|Neil R. Larsen1,14115.11%
|
|Ann Mazur4135.47%
|
|Mike Uhryn (Con. Social.)470.62%
||
|Horst A. Schmid
|-
|Edmonton-Belmont|||
|Albert Edward Hohol6,66264.72%
|
|Victor Nakonechny1,16411.31%
|
|Ashley Pachal1,75917.09%
|
|John Day6616.42%
|
|Chris Hansen (Comm.)270.26%|||
|Albert Edward Hohol
|-
|Edmonton-Beverly|||
|Bill W. Diachuk5,04661.81%
|
|Patrick A. Moore7649.36%
|
|Bill Kobluk1,90223.30%
|
|Rudolph Pisesky3744.58%
|
|Paul Jarbeau (Comm.)600.73%|||
|Bill W. Diachuk
|-
|Edmonton-Calder|||
|Tom Chambers5,68967.96%
|
|
|
|Burke Barker1,64019.59%
|
|Jack Pickett6207.41%
|
|Keith Lawson (Ind.)3964.73%|||
|Tom Chambers
|-
|Edmonton-Centre|||
|Gordon Miniely3,99661.79%
|
|Gerry Beck3865.97%
|
|Barry Roberts1,12517.40%
|
|Ed Molstad93014.38%
|
||||
|Gordon Miniely
|-
|Edmonton-Glenora|||
|Lou Hyndman7,73574.14%
|
|Al Opstad7827.50%
|
|Alex McEachern1,83717.61%
|
|
|
|William Askin (Con. Social.)440.42%
||
|Lou Hyndman
|-
|Edmonton-Gold Bar|||
|William Yurko5,24764.14%
|
|Larry Latter98212.00%
|
|Grant Arnold1,31216.04%
|
|Don Hoyda5797.08%
|
|Harry J. Strynadka (Comm.)280.34%|||
|William Yurko
|-
|Edmonton-Highlands|||
|David T. King3,08558.66%
|
|Ambrose Holowach88816.89%
|
|Muriel Venne1,12921.47%
|
|
|
|William A. Tuomi (Comm.)821.56%|||
|David T. King
|-
|Edmonton-Jasper Place|||
|Leslie Gordon Young5,43666.02%
|
|Don Eastcott1,03512.57%
|
|Carol Berry1,19214.48%
|
|Philip Lister4915.96%
|
||||
|Leslie Gordon Young
|-
|Edmonton-Kingsway|||
|Kenneth R.H. Paproski4,89765.96%
|
|Jake Johnson6198.34%
|
|Jane Weaver1,41819.10%
|
|Roy Landreth4726.36%
|
||||
|Kenneth R.H. Paproski
|-
|Edmonton-Meadowlark|||
|Gerard Joseph Amerongen6,71567.66%
|
|Russ Forsythe1,09311.01%
|
|Harvey Tilden1,40614.17%
|
|Vic Yanda6987.03%
|
||||
|Gerard Joseph Amerongen
|-
|Edmonton-Norwood|||
|Catherine Chichak4,29858.80%
|
|Alfred J. Hooke1,04514.30%
|
|Howard Rubin1,84925.29%
|
|
|
|Gary Hansen (Comm.)480.66%|||
|Catherine Chichak
|-
|Edmonton-Ottewell|||
|John G. Ashton8,80770.85%
|
|Irvine Zemrau1,55912.54%
|
|Jim Denholm2,00316.11%
|
|
|
||||
|John G. Ashton
|-
|Edmonton-Parkallen|||
|Neil S. Crawford4,81062.18%
|
|Glen Carlson90411.69%
|
|Brian Fish1,54619.98%
|
|Brian Erickson4615.96%
|
||||
|Neil S. Crawford
|-
|Edmonton-Strathcona|||
|Julian Koziak3,99654.21%
|
|Betty Horch76810.42%
|
|Gordon S.B. Wright2,10828.60%
|
|Arthur Yates4155.63%
|
|Kimball Cariou (Comm.)280.38%Harry Garfinkel (Con. Social.)240.33%
||
|Julian Koziak
|-
|Edmonton-Whitemud|||
|Donald Ross Getty9,61467.66%
|
|Phil Dickson1,1017.75%
|
|Lila Fahlman2,64518.61%
|
|Dilys Andersen8305.84%
|
||||
|Donald Ross Getty
|-
|Edson|||
|Robert W. Dowling3,87264.96%
|
|Ralph Bond65110.92%
|
|John Lindsay1,42623.92%
|
|
|
||||
|Robert W. Dowling
|-
|Grande Prairie|||
|Winston Backus6,46661.08%
|
|John Baergen1,47513.93%
|
|Ross Campbell1,96218.53%
|
|Gordon Astle6516.15%
|
||||
|Winston Backus
|-
|Hanna-Oyen|||
|John Edward Butler2,92768.61%
|
|Alfred Weik81719.15%
|
|David Urichuk1343.14%
|
|Lyall Alexander Curry3788.86%
|
||||
|Clinton Keith French
|-
|Highwood|||
|George Wolstenholme4,03763.64%
|
|Edward P. Benoit1,92530.35%
|
|Muriel McCreary2343.69%
|
|Melbe Cochlan1251.97%
|
||||
|Edward P. Benoit
|-
|Innisfail|||
|Clifford L. Doan4,02966.27%
|
|Raymond C. Reckseidler1,51224.87%
|
|Pat Loughlin3766.18%
|
|Fred Monk1472.42%
|
||||
|Clifford L. Doan
|-
|Lac La Biche-McMurray|||
|Ron Tesolin2,85952.68%
|
|Ken Cochrane56010.32%
|
|Ronald Morgan5309.77%
|
|Jean Davidson70312.95%
|
|Mike Chandi (Ind. P.C.)73713.68%
||
|Dan Bouvier
|-
|Lacombe|||
|John William Cookson4,18668.42%
|
|Ivan Stonehocker1,41423.11%
|
|Ed Kamps4867.94%
|
|
|
||||
|John William Cookson
|-
|Lesser Slave Lake|||
|Larry R. Shaben2,38757.91%
|
|Dennis Barton92122.34%
|
|John Tomkins79119.19%
|
|
|
||||
|Dennis Barton
|-
|Lethbridge-East|||
|Archibald Dick Johnston7,23366.82%
|
|John V. Anderson1,91517.69%
|
|Bessie Annand1,0069.29%
|
|Shirley Wilson6455.96%
|
||||
|John V. Anderson
|-
|Lethbridge-West|||
|John Gogo3,99158.26%
|
|Richard David Gruenwald1,91427.94%
|
|Ian Whishaw81211.85%
|
|
|
||||
|Richard David Gruenwald
|-
|Little Bow
|
|George McMorris2,01937.08%|||
|Raymond Albert Speaker3,13257.52%
|
|Wayne Doolittle1262.31%
|
|Ben Loman1572.88%
|
||||
|Raymond Albert Speaker
|-
|Lloydminster|||
|James Edgar Miller4,37081.94%
|
|
|
|Dave Listoe93817.59%
|
|
|
||||
|James Edgar Miller
|-
|Macleod|||
|Thomas James John Walker3,67155.37%
|
|Leighton E. Buckwell2,35935.58%
|
|Kathleen M. Cairns3304.98%
|
|Bill Olafson2313.48%
|
||||
|Leighton E. Buckwell
|-
|Medicine Hat-Redcliff|||
|James Horsman5,67846.33%
|
|William Wyse5,54845.27%
|
|Bill Hartley4173.40%
|
|David Wilkins5324.34%
|
|Hilory Sorschan (Ind. P.C.)530.43%
||
|William Wyse
|-
|Olds-Didsbury
|
|Kenneth Amthor2,86038.26%|||
|Robert Curtis Clark4,40058.86%
|
|Margaret Hinton2092.80%
|
|
|
||||
|Robert Curtis Clark
|-
|Peace River|||
|Al (Boomer) Adair3,56760.76%
|
|Budd Dennis89715.28%
|
|John Hokanson1,29222.01%
|
|
|
|Vera Lane (Ind. Lib.)921.57
||
|Al (Boomer) Adair
|-
|Pincher Creek-Crowsnest|||
|Frederick Deryl Bradley3,20959.81%
|
|Charles Duncan Drain1,83734.24%
|
|David Elliot2354.38%
|
|
|
|Gwen Gyulai (Ind.)490.91%|||
|Charles Duncan Drain
|-
|Ponoka|||
|Donald J. McCrimmon3,32859.60%
|
|Alvin Goetz1,26322.62%
|
|Boug Lier93216.69%
|
|
|
||||
|Donald J. McCrimmon
|-
|Red Deer|||
|James L. Foster6,56665.74%
|
|Cecil Spiers1,53815.40%
|
|Ken McMillan1,31713.19%
|
|Herb Fielding5495.50%
|
||||
|James L. Foster
|-
|Redwater-Andrew|||
|George Topolnisky3,78465.60%
|
|
|
|Graham Crosbie1,82431.62%
|
|
|
|Neil Stenberg (Comm.)1162.01%|||
|George Topolnisky
|-
|Rocky Mountain House|||
|Helen Hunley4,11965.95%
|
|Harvey Staudinger1,53724.61%
|
|Morris Jenson5769.22%
|
|
|
||||
|Helen Hunley
|-
|Sedgewick-Coronation|||
|Henry Kroeger2,75756.15%
|
|Ralph A. Sorenson1,76836.01%
|
|Gladys Creasy3707.54%
|
|
|
||||
|Ralph A. Sorenson
|-
|Smoky River|||
|Marvin Moore3,44660.34%
|
|Obert Amundson3476.08%
|
|Victor Tardif1,77831.13%
|
|John Hinks1192.08%
|
||||
|Marvin Moore
|-
|Spirit River-Fairview
|
|Alex Woronuk2,91848.76%
|
||||
|Grant W. Notley3,01750.42%
|
|
|
||||
|Grant W. Notley
|-
|St. Albert|||
|William Ernest Jamison6,45054.32%
|
|Keith Everitt2,22118.70%
|
|Earl Toane1,59113.40%
|
|John Bakker1,56413.17%
|
||||
|William Ernest Jamison
|-
|St. Paul|||
|Mick Fluker2,91257.05%
|
|John Hull84816.61%
|
|Pierre M. Vallee76414.97%
|
|Roland Genereux56110.99%
|
||||
|Mick Fluker
|-
|Stettler|||
|Graham L. Harle3,77374.95%
|
|James Mah86617.20%
|
|William Cook3607.15%
|
|
|
||||
|Jack G. Robertson
|-
|Stony Plain|||
|William Frederick Purdy5,10963.31%
|
|Dean Throness1,11313.79%
|
|Jim Bell92311.44%
|
|Betty Howery6287.78%
|
|Arthur Killoran (Ind. P.C.)2693.34%
||
|William Frederick Purdy
|-
|Taber-Warner|||
|Robert Bogle4,61463.59%
|
|Werner G. Schmidt2,41833.32%
|
|Brian Aman2022.78%
|
|
|
||||
|Douglas Miller
|-
|Three Hills|||
|Allan Warrack4,26869.66%
|
|Bob Sommerville1,40622.95%
|
|Bruce Potter1923.13%
|
|Wes Combs2524.11%
|
||||
|Allan Warrack
|-
|Vegreville|||
|John S. Batiuk3,64453.26%
|
|Ernie Youzwishen90813.27%
|
|Barney Welsh2,27033.18%
|
|
|
||||
|John S. Batiuk
|-
|Vermilion-Viking|||
|Tom Lysons2,73154.10%
|
|Angus MacMillan1,27425.24%
|
|Ken Jaremco1,01920.19%
|
|
|
||||
|Ashley H. Cooper
|-
|Wainwright|||
|Charles Stewart3,03958.91%
|
|Bev Penman1,61631.32%
|
|Harold Tangen4969.61%
|
|
|
||||
|Henry A. Ruste
|-
|Wetaskiwin-Leduc|||
|Dallas Schmidt7,54463.76%
|
|Waldo Siemens2,07617.55%
|
|Earl R. Rasmuson1,66214.05%
|
|Pat Green5224.41%
|
||||
|James D. Henderson
|-
|Whitecourt|||
|Peter Trynchy3,92171.15%
|
|Rig Godwin67612.27%
|
|John Udchitz89316.20%
|
|
|
||||
|Peter Trynchy
|-
|}

See also
List of Alberta political parties

References

Works cited

 
 

1975 elections in Canada
1975
March 1975 events in Canada
1975 in Alberta